Inverkirkaig is extremely remote scattered crofting township, situated on the north eastern bay, of the sea loch Loch Kirkaig, in the Assynt district  of Sutherland, Scottish Highlands and is in the Scottish council area of Highland.

The hamlets of Badnaban, Strathan and Lochinver are situated directly north of the township.

References

Populated places in Sutherland